Through Thick and Thin is the second full-length album by San Diego punk band Dogwood.

Track listing
 All Hands On Deck 
 Preschool Days 
 Stairway to Sin 
 Patriotic Pride 
 Tribute 
 Daddy Dearest 
 Through Thick and Thin 
 In The Line of Fire 
 Just Because 
 Jesus 
 Who am I to Say Who Deserves What? 
 Family Values 
 Joy Through Movement

Dogwood (band) albums
1997 albums